Nymphargus chancas (common name: Peru Cochran frog) is a species of frog in the family Centrolenidae. Until recently it was only known from its type locality in the Lamas Province in Peru; however, it is now known to occur more widely in the northern San Martín Region of Peru, extending into the Cordillera del Cóndor in Zamora-Chinchipe Province, Ecuador.

Description
Adult males measure  in snout–vent length; female length has not been reported. The snout is truncate, or sometimes slightly protruding laterally. The tympanum is visible, with its upper hidden by the supra-tympanic fold and tubercles. The toes are two-thirds webbed. Dorsal coloration varies from dull yellow green to orage yellow or olive gray. There are distinct yellow flecks on the dorsum, which can occasionally belarge and bright. However, individuals can change their color rapidly. One specimen had prominent occellations that faded after capture. The iris can be pale yellowish-bronze, or silvery-white with a faint yellow suffusion.

Habitat and conservation
Nymphargus chancas is an arboreal frog found in montane cloud forests near streams. It is nocturnal.

Its conservation status is Endangered. The Cordillera del Cóndor population is threatened by habitat destruction and pollution associated with mining.

References

chancas
Amphibians of Ecuador
Amphibians of Peru
Taxa named by William Edward Duellman
Amphibians described in 1993
Taxonomy articles created by Polbot